The great-tailed triok (Dactylopsila megalura) is a species of marsupial in the family Petauridae. It is found in West Papua and Papua New Guinea. Its natural habitat is subtropical or tropical dry forests.

References

Possums
Marsupials of New Guinea
Mammals of Papua New Guinea
Mammals of Western New Guinea
Least concern biota of Oceania
Mammals described in 1932
Taxonomy articles created by Polbot